3 Corvi is a single star in the southern constellation of Corvus, located 192 light years away from the Sun. It is visible to the naked eye as a faint, white-hued star with an apparent visual magnitude of 5.45. This object is moving further from the Earth with a heliocentric radial velocity of +14 km/s.

This is an A-type main-sequence star with a stellar classification of A1 V. It has 2.14 times the mass of the Sun and 1.87 times the Sun's radius. The star is around 900 million years old with a high rate of rotation, showing a projected rotational velocity of 130 km/s. It is radiating ten times the luminosity of the Sun from its photosphere at an effective temperature of 9,671 K. An infrared excess has been detected, suggesting that a debris disk with a temperature of 150 K is orbiting  from the host star.

References

A-type main-sequence stars
Circumstellar disks
Corvus (constellation)
Durchmusterung objects
Corvi, 3
105850
059394
4635